Bertya is a genus of plants in the family Euphorbiaceae first described as a genus in 1845. The entire genus is endemic to Australia.

Species

formerly included
moved to Ricinocarpos

References 

 
Euphorbiaceae genera
Endemic flora of Australia